Cham-e Heydar (also Romanized as Cham-e Ḩeydar) is a village in Cham Kuh Rural District, Bagh-e Bahadoran District, Lenjan County, Isfahan Province, Iran. At the 2006 census, its population was 752, in 203 families.

Notes 

Populated places in Lenjan County